Vitrea contracta is a species of small, air-breathing land snail, a terrestrial pulmonate gastropod mollusk in the family Pristilomatidae.

Description

For terms see gastropod shell.

The 2.2-2.6 mm. shell is colourless translucent and shiny. It is almost smooth with 4-5 whorls, the last whorl width seen from above 1.4-1.6 x of penultimate whorl. The umbilicus is moderately wide, becoming wider at the last whorl.

Distribution 
This species occurs in countries and islands including:
 Czech Republic
 Ukraine
 Great Britain
 Ireland
 and other areas

References

External links

[http://www.animalbase.uni-goettingen.de/zooweb/servlet/AnimalBase/home/species?id=755  Vitrea contracta] at Animalbase taxonomy,short description, distribution, biology,status (threats), images

Pristilomatidae
Gastropods described in 1871